Sokoľany is a village and municipality in Košice-okolie District in the Košice Region of eastern Slovakia.

History
In historical records the village was first mentioned in 1251.

Geography
The village lies at an altitude of 210 metres and covers an area of 3.858 km².
It has a population of about 1120 people.

Ethnicity
The population is almost entirely Slovak in ethnicity.

Government

The village relies on the tax and district offices and fire brigade at Košice.

Culture
The village has a public library and is connected to cable television. It has a food store.

Sport
The village has a football pitch and a gymnasium.

Transport
The nearest railway station is located 1 kilometre away.

External links
https://web.archive.org/web/20070513023228/http://www.statistics.sk/mosmis/eng/run.html

Villages and municipalities in Košice-okolie District